Bedara Kannappa is a 1954 Indian Kannada-language Hindu mythological film directed by H. L. N. Simha and written by G. V. Iyer. The film stars Rajkumar playing the title character along with Pandari Bai, Kushala Kumari, G. V. Iyer, Sandhya and Narasimharaju in other prominent roles. The film is an adaptation of a stage play by the Gubbi Veeranna Nataka Company, which was based on the folk tale of the hunter Kannappa who proves his extreme devotion to the Hindu God Shiva by gouging out both his eyes.

Bedara Kannappa started as a play produced by the Gubbi Veeranna Nataka Company before it became a Kannada film. The film rights of the play were later bought by A. V. Meiyappan of AVM Productions. The film's songs were composed by R. Sudarsanam, with lyrics written by S. Nanjappa. The cinematography of the film was handled by S. Maruthi Rao. In 1953, Singanalluru Puttaswamaiah Muthuraj, a dramatist with Gubbi Veeranna Nataka Company was spotted by director H. L. N. Simha, who was on the lookout for well-built, pleasant-faced man for the starring role in film. Simha eventually signed Muthuraj for the film and named him Rajkumar. Filming began in mid-1953 and took over two months to complete. This was the debut film of both Rajkumar and Narasimharaju as actors and of G.V. Iyer as a scriptwriter.

Bedara Kannappa was released on May 7, 1954 in Bangalore's Sagar and Shivaji theatres and New Opera theatre in Mysore to low expectations. The owners of New Opera theatre, thought that at best it would only run for two weeks. However, defying expectations; The film was critically and commercially successful, becoming the first Kannada film to have a direct run of 365 days.  The film was the inaugural recipient of the National Film Award for Best Feature Film in Kannada, thereby becoming the first Kannada film to win a National Film Award. Following the film's success in Karnataka, it was dubbed into Tamil and released as Vedan Kannappa. Later, the film was remade in Telugu as Kalahasti Mahatyam also starring Rajkumar, in his only non-Kannada film appearance. The film was also remade in Hindi in 1955 by the same director-producer duo as Shiv Bhakta. It was again remade in Telugu in 1976 as Bhakta Kannappa.

Plot 
Dinna (Rajkumar) and Neela (Pandharibai) are gods banished to earth where they are born to a tribe of hunters. They grow up and become involved with a corrupt temple priest who accuses Dinna of theft. Dinna weathers all the tests, including torture, the gods impose on him.

Cast

Soundtrack
The film's soundtrack was composed by R. Sudharsanam. The song Shivappa Kayo Tande (literally Shiva, protect me oh father) is very popular and is sung even today in orchestras.

Kannada tracklist
Lyrics were by S. Nanjappa. Playback singers are C. S. Jayaraman, T. A. Mothi, M. L. Vasanthakumari, T. S. Bagavathi & P. Susheela.

Tamil tracklist
Playback singers are T. M. Soundararajan, T. A. Mothi, Thiruchi Loganathan, M. L. Vasanthakumari, T. S. Bagavathi, Radha Jayalakshmi & P. Susheela.

Release and reception 
When the film was ready, there were no distributors willing to pick it up. But thanks to the intervention of the chief minister of the state, S. Nijalingappa, they could release it through Karnataka Films. The owners of New Opera theatre in Mysore, where it ran for a 100 days, thought that at best it would run for two weeks. But they were in for a big shock when people from different parts of the state streamed in to watch the film. Among those who turned up for the first show at Mysore, was Rajkumar himself with his father.

Awards
 National Film Awards
2nd National Film Awards (1954) - Certificate of Merit for the Best Feature Film in Kannada

Legacy 
The film is often regarded by critics as a landmark film in Kannada film history. The film also became the first Kannada film to gain national recognition as it became the first film to win the Certificate of Merit for the Best Feature Film in Kannada. The success of the film was reported to have spurred the pace of production of Kannada language films significantly. Bedara Kannappa acquired cult status in Kannada cinema and became a trendsetter for dialogues and acting for later Kannada films.

References

External links
 
 Songs from Bedara Kannapa
 
 

1954 films
1950s Kannada-language films
Films scored by R. Sudarsanam
Hindu devotional films
Indian biographical films
Kannada films remade in other languages
1950s biographical films
Indian black-and-white films
Films directed by H. L. N. Simha